Lalgudi Saptarishi Ramamrutham (30 October 1915 – 30 October 2007) was an eminent Tamil novelist, who authored 300 short stories, 6 novels and 10 collections of essays. He won Sahitya Akademi Award for his contributions to Tamil literature. He died on his ninety-Second birthday.

Early life and education
His ancestors were natives of Lalgudi, Trichy District and one of the writers of the Manikodi era. He spent his entire childhood and adolescent years in Ayyampettai village near Kanchipuram. His father took special care on his son and personally home tutored him advanced Tamil and English that instilled in him a love of Tamil and English Classics even at an early age. He studied from 8th to 10 Standard in Government School. He started writing when he was 20, originally in English and then changed over to Tamil. He worked for the Punjab National Bank for 30 years and settled down in Chennai after his retirement.

Professional career
La Sa Ra worked for three years as a typist in Vauhini Pictures, which then produced a series of landmark Telugu films like Vande Mataram, Sumangali, and Devata. It was then K. Ramnoth, another South Indian film director, told La Sa Ra not to waste his gift indicating that his hoping for a career in films would not be salutary. He ultimately became a banker but he continued with his writing.

Awards and recognition
He won the Sahitya Akademi Award in 1989 for Chintha nathi, a collection of autobiographical essays.

Bibliography

Novels

1.Puthra(1965)

2.Abitha(1970)

3.Kal Sirikkirathu

4.Prayachiththam

5.Kalugu

6.keralathil engo

Short Stories

1.Janani(1957)

2.Ithalgal(1959)

3.Pachai Kanavu(1961)

4.Ganga(1962)

5.Anjali(1963)

6.Alaigal(1964)

7.Dhaya(1966)

8.Meenottam

9.Uththarayanam

10.Nesam

11.Putru

12.Thulasi

13.En priyamulla Snegithanukku

14.Aval

15.Dhvani

16.Vilimbil

17.Alaigal

18.Naan

19.Sowndarya

Essays

1.Mutruperatha Thedal

2.Unmaiyana Dharisanam

See also
 List of Indian writers

References

1915 births
2007 deaths
Indian writers
Tamil-language writers
Recipients of the Sahitya Akademi Award in Tamil